Halnefjorden is a large lake on the border of Vestland and Viken counties in Norway.  It is located in the municipalities of Hol and Nore og Uvdal in Viken county and in Eidfjord municipality in Vestland county.  At , it is among the largest lakes located on the vast Hardangervidda plateau.  The Norwegian National Road 7 runs along the northern shore of the lake, and that is the only road access to the lake.  The lake is one of the headwaters of the river Numedalslågen.

See also
List of lakes in Norway

References

Lakes of Vestland
Lakes of Viken (county)
Eidfjord
Hol
Nore og Uvdal